RScheme is a Scheme implementation developed by Donovan Kolbly, with an object-orientation approach adapted from Dylan.

RScheme implements all of R4RS except transcript-on and transcript-off, and all of R5RS except define-syntax. In addition, RScheme has a reflective object system, many operating system services, modules, threads, and other systems programming features, including the ability to integrate with and compile to C code.

Code in RScheme can be compiled to C, and the C can then compiled with a normal C compiler to generate machine code. By default, to keep compilation fast and the code size down, RScheme compiles to bytecodes which are interpreted by a (runtime) virtual machine. On some systems, compiling to C can be done on-the-fly, with the resulting object code dynamically loaded back into the image for execution.

RScheme is the only known publicly available Scheme implementation to include a real-time safe garbage collector.

External links
 
 
 RScheme -- The Implementation 

Scheme (programming language) compilers
Scheme (programming language) interpreters
Scheme (programming language) implementations
Free compilers and interpreters